The American Name Society (ANS) is a non-profit organization founded in 1951 to promote onomastics, the study of names and naming practices, both in the United States and abroad. The organization investigates cultural insights, settlement history, and linguistic characteristics revealed in names.

The ANS runs an annual conference for name scholars and enthusiasts, and it is the largest scholarly society dedicated to "the investigation of names and how they develop". Since 1952, the ANS has produced the journal Names, which publishes articles on names. The American Dialect Society was the parent organization of ANS. It has also been associated with the Modern Language Association.

History 
In the early 1950s, members of the American Dialect Society felt that there ought to be another organization focused on the function of proper nouns. On December 29, 1951, in Detroit, a group of academics voted to create the American Name Society, which would focus on onomastics and publish a quarterly journal with content written by society members. The founders appointed a Sponsoring Committee with 29 members and elected a president, Elsdon C. Smith. The first meeting was held on December 27, 1952, in Boston. The ANS has had a broad scope since its inception, and attracts specialists from a variety of fields.

Names: A Journal of Onomastics 
In March 1953, the ANS began publishing Names, "a journal of onomastics." The first volume of Names, the journal published by ANS, was published in March 1953, edited by Erwin Gudde. George R. Stewart, a founding member of the ANS, described his vision for using Names to define the field of onomastics. As of January 2021, all current and archived issues of Names became available for free via the Open Access program at the University of Pittsburgh. In 2022, Names was awarded the exclusive DOAJ Seal from the Directory of Open Access Journals, reflecting best practices in open access publishing. Professor I.M. Nick is the current Editor-in-Chief of Names.

Awards

Emerging Scholar Award
The Emerging Scholar Award recognizes names researchers in the early stages of their academic or professional careers. The awardee receives recognition at the annual meeting, a cash prize of $250, one year of membership in the ANS, and mentoring by a senior onomastics scholar who will assist the awardee in preparing his/her paper for submission and possible publication in Names: A Journal of Onomastics.

Best Article in Names: A Journal of Onomastics  
The Best Article in Names: A Journal of Onomastics Award is given to only one article per year according to the significance of the article and its relevance to the science of onomastics. The award committee of three reviewers operates independently of the editors.

Name of the Year 
Since 2004, the ANS has declared a Name of the Year. Each year, the public can nominate a name by contacting the Name of the Year election coordinator with justification for the name's inclusion. ANS members can also nominate names at the annual meeting. Nominated names are judged on three criteria: linguistic innovation, potential to impact language use, and ability to capture national attention. Since 2008, the ANS has voted on the top personal name, place name, trade name, and fictional name at its annual conference.

Related organizations
The American Name Society is allied with the Modern Language Association (MLA).

Sister Societies
The American Name Society is a member of a group of sister societies that meet concurrently with the Linguistic Society of America:

American Dialect Society (ADS)
North American Association for the History of Language Sciences (NAAHoLS)
Society for Pidgin and Creole Linguistics (SPCL)
Society for the Study of the Indigenous Languages of the Americas (SSILA)
The Association for Linguistic Evidence (TALE)
The North American Research Network in Historical Sociolinguistics (NARNiHS)

References

External links
 
 Names: A Journal of Onomastics

Linguistic societies
American English
Learned societies of the United States
Onomastics
1952 establishments in the United States